Carla Castañé García (born 1 June 2005 in Sabadell) is a Catalan Spanish actress and model.

Biography 
Carla Castañé was born on June 1, 2005 in Sabadell, in the province of Barcelona (Spain), to mother Nuria García and father Juan Carlos Castañé, and has a sister named Berta (also an actress and model) and a brother who her name is Joan.

Career 
Carla Castañé in 2014 made her first appearance on the small screen in the 39+1 series, in the role of Taüll. The following year, in 2015, she participated in the 080 Barcellona Fashion competition.

In 2015 she played the role of Marta as a child in the film Cómo sobrevivir a una despedida directed by Manuela Burló Moreno. The following year, in 2016, she held the role of Mariona in the Cites series.

In 2019 she played the role of Bea as a young man in the film Gente que viene y bah directed by Patricia Font. The following year, in 2020, he starred in the short film Forastera directed by Lucía Aleñar Iglesias.

Filmography

Film

TV series

Short films

Fashion

References

External links 

 
 
 

2005 births
Living people
Spanish television actresses
Spanish female models